Baazi is a 2021 Indian Bengali-language action thriller film directed by Anshuman Pratyush and produced by Jeet, Gopal Madnani and Amit Jumrani under the banner of Jeetz Filmworks Pvt. Ltd. It stars Jeet and Mimi Chakraborty and is an official remake of the Telugu film Nannaku Prematho (2016). The film was shot in London and the shoot was wrapped up in October 2020. It revolves around a man (Jeet), who vows to take revenge in order to give his father (Abhishek Chatterjee) a new life. The film was to release on 14 May 2021, but got postponed due to COVID-19 pandemic aftermath. It was released on 10 October 2021 coinciding with Puja holidays.

Synopsis
Baazi is a revenge story, where a son takes revenge for his father. A conman cheats an entrepreneur and takes his wealth. The man is suffering from a terminal disease and wants his son to take revenge for him. The son goes to London to seek revenge on the person, who is now rich and powerful. He befriends his daughter to approach him.

Cast
 Jeet as Aditya Mukherjee
 Mimi Chakraborty as Kyra
 Abhishek Chatterjee as Rudra Pratap Mukherjee, Aditya's father
 Biswanath Basu as Kancha
 Sabyasachi Chakraborty as Krishna Kumar Bardhan, Kyra's father, the main antagonist
 Debdoot Ghosh as Bikram Mukherjee, Aditya's brother
 Somnath Kar as Joy, Krishna Kumar's assistant
 Pradip Dhar
 Nandini Chatterjee
 Nanak Madnani
 Rohan Mitra

Production
Baazi was announced in February 2020,is an official remake of Nannaku Prematho with Jeet and Mimi Chakraborty as leading pair. The first shot of the film was taken in February 2020. The filming in London was suspended in March 2020 due to COVID-19 pandemic and production team returned to India. The filming was resumed on 10 October 2020, after lockdown due to the pandemic.

Release
The film was to release on 14 May 2021, but postponed due to COVID-19 pandemic. The film was released on 10 October 2021 coinciding with Puja holidays.

Soundtrack
Soundtrack of the film is composed by Jeet Gannguli and lyrics penned by Pratik Kundu and Pranjol.

References

External links
 

2021 films
2020s Bengali-language films
Bengali-language Indian films
Film productions suspended due to the COVID-19 pandemic
Films postponed due to the COVID-19 pandemic
Indian action thriller films
Films shot in London 
Bengali remakes of Telugu films
Films scored by Jeet Ganguly